The rufous-faced antpitta (Grallaria erythrotis) is a species of bird in the family Grallariidae. It is endemic to Bolivia.

This antpitta has dark olivaceous-gray to olivaceous-brown upperparts and tail. Its lores, face, and side of the neck are orange rufous. The throat and belly are white, with the breast orange rufous with faint white streaking.

Its natural habitats are subtropical or tropical moist montane forest and heavily degraded former forest.

References

External links

 
 
 
 
 
 

rufous-faced antpitta
Birds of the Bolivian Andes
Endemic birds of Bolivia
rufous-faced antpitta
rufous-faced antpitta
rufous-faced antpitta
Taxonomy articles created by Polbot